Fluorobenzoic acid may refer to:

 2-Fluorobenzoic acid (ortho)
 3-Fluorobenzoic acid (meta)
 4-Fluorobenzoic acid (para)

Benzoic acids